A block is an administrative division of some South Asian countries.

Bhutan

In Bhutan, a block is called a gewog. It is essentially for oil a group of villages. Gewogs are official administrative units of Bhutan. The country is composed of 205 gewogs. 

Each gewog is headed by a gup or headman.

India

Block is a district sub-division for the purpose of rural development department and Panchayati Raj institutes. Cities have similar arrangements under the Urban Development department. Tehsils (also called Taluks) are common across urban and rural areas for the administration of land and revenue department to keep tract of land ownership and levy the land tax.

For planning purpose, a district is divided into four levels:  
 Tehsils
 Blocks
 Gram Panchayats
 Villages
A tehsil may consist of one or more number of blocks. Blocks are usually planning & development units of a district in addition to tehsils. A block represents a compact area for which effective plans are prepared and implemented through Gram Panchayats.

For example, Muzaffarnagar District of Uttar Pradesh has 9 blocks: Muzaffarnagar, Budhana, Baghra, Shahpur, Purquazi, Charthawal, Morna, Jansath, and Khatauli.

Block Development Officer 
The Block Development Officer is the official in charge of a block. Block Development Officer monitor the implementation of all programmes relating to planning and development of the blocks. Coordination of development and implementation of plans in all blocks of a district is provided by a Chief Development Officer (CDO). BDO's office is the main operational wing of the government for the development administration as well as regulatory administration.

See also
 List of community development blocks in India

References

Types of administrative division
Administrative divisions of India